, there were about 5,000 electric vehicles registered in Alabama.

Government policy
, the state government does not offer any tax incentives for electric vehicle purchases.

, the state government charges an annual $200 registration fee for electric vehicles.

Charging stations
, there were 276 public charging stations in Alabama.

The Infrastructure Investment and Jobs Act, signed into law in November 2021, allocates  to charging stations in Alabama.

Manufacturing
Alabama has been widely proposed as a hub for electric vehicle manufacturing.

By region

Birmingham
, there were 100 public charging stations in Birmingham.

Huntsville
, there were 15 public charging stations in the Huntsville metropolitan area.

Mobile
, there were 43 public charging stations in Mobile.

References

Alabama
Road transportation in Alabama